James Orin Bass (July 12, 1910 – May 21, 2019) was an American lawyer and politician.

Biography
Bass was born in Hendersonville, Tennessee. He went to the Nashville public schools and graduated from Montgomery Bell Academy in 1928. Bass graduated from Sewanee: The University of the South in 1931 and from Harvard Law School in 1934. Bell was admitted to the Tennessee bar and practiced law in Nashville, Tennessee. Bass served in the Tennessee House of Representatives from 1936 to 1939 and in the Tennessee Senate from 1940 to 1942. Bass was a Democrat. He served in the United States Army during World War II and was commissioned a lieutenant colonel.

Notes

External links

1910 births
2019 deaths
People from Hendersonville, Tennessee
Politicians from Nashville, Tennessee
Military personnel from Tennessee
Tennessee lawyers
Sewanee: The University of the South alumni
Harvard Law School alumni
Democratic Party members of the Tennessee House of Representatives
Democratic Party Tennessee state senators
American centenarians
Men centenarians
20th-century American lawyers